Maty Cissokho is a Senegalese footballer who plays as a defender for US Parcelles Assainies and the Senegal women's national team.

Club career
Cissokho has played for AFA Grand-Yoff and Parcelles Assainies in Dakar, Senegal.

International career
Cissokho capped for Senegal at senior level during the 2022 Africa Women Cup of Nations qualification.

References

External links

Living people
People from M'Bour
Senegalese women's footballers
Women's association football defenders
Senegal women's international footballers
Year of birth missing (living people)